Závišice is a municipality and village in Nový Jičín District in the Moravian-Silesian Region of the Czech Republic. It has about 1,100 inhabitants.

History
The first written mention of Závišice is from 1354.

References

External links

Villages in Nový Jičín District